Oneta is a comune (municipality) in the Province of Bergamo in the Italian region of Lombardy, located about  northeast of Milan and about  northeast of Bergamo.

The municipality of Oneta contains the frazioni (subdivisions, mainly villages and hamlets) Scullera, Cantoni, Case Fanfani, Molino, and Case Belotti.

Oneta borders the following municipalities: Colzate, Cornalba, Gorno, Oltre il Colle, Premolo, Vertova.

Demographic evolution

References